{{Infobox writer 
| name = Leslie Edgley
| image =
| caption =
| pseudonym = Robert Bloomfield, Michael Gillian, Brook Hastings
| birth_date = 
| birth_name = Leslie John Edgley
| birth_place = 
| death_date = 
| death_place = 
| occupation = Novelist, radio dramatist, screenwriter
|alma_mater =
| genre = Mystery| notable_works = Perry Mason
| spouse = Mary Anna Gustaitis
| children = 3Montgomery, Marge (September 13, 1958). "Families Adopt Exchange Students for Academic Year; Jill's Idea Too; Diet Fad". Los Angeles Citizen-News. p. 10. Retrieved June 1, 2022.
| influences =
| influenced =
}}

Leslie John Edgley (October 14, 1912 – August 9, 2002) was a mystery fiction writer, radio dramatist screenwriter and playwright. Among the works for which he became known are the scripts for many episodes of Perry Mason. 

Early life and career
Edgley was born in London in 1912, but emigrated with his parents to Canada in 1918; four years later, they came to the United States, finally putting down roots in East Chicago, Indiana. Edgley spent his formative years in the Marktown district, graduating from Washington High School in 1930. In 1936, one year after marrying East Chicago native Mary Anna Gustaitis; Edgley attained United States citizenship. In 1944, the couple relocated to California.Kott, Anthony J. (February 16, 1940). "East Chicago Is Locale of Novel's Plot; Former Harbor Youth Author of Powerful New Work of Fiction". The Hammond Times. p. 45. Retrieved May 31, 2022.

Works
as Leslie EdgleyNo Birds Sing, New York, Farrar & Rinehart, 1940, 328 pp.Fear No More, New York, Simon and Schuster, 1946, 202 pp.
Reprinted by Ace, 1953, bound dos-à-dos with Hal Braham (as Mel Colton), Never Kill A CopFalse Face, New York, Simon and Schuster, 1946, 202 pp.The Angry Heart, Garden City, N.Y., Published for the Crime Club by Doubleday, 1947, 190 pp.
Reprinted as Tracked Down by Ace, 1954, bound dos-à-dos with Martin L. Weiss, Death Hitches A RideThe Judas Goat, Garden City, N.Y., Published for the Crime Club by Doubleday, 1952, 190 pp.
Reprinted by Ace, 1953, bound dos-à-dos with Theodore S. Drachman, Cry Plague!The Runaway Pigeon, Garden City, N.Y., Published for the Crime Club by Doubleday, 1953, 188 pp.
Also published as One Blonde Died, Lawrence E. Pivak, N.Y., 1953, Bestseller Mystery B171
Published in UK as Diamonds Spell Death, Arthur Barker, 1954, Museum Street Thriller seriesA Dirty Business, New York, G.P. Putnam's Sons, 1969, 182 pp.

as Robert BloomfieldShadow of Guilt, New York, Doubleday, 1947From This Day Forward, New York, Doubleday, 1952Lust for Vengeance, New York, Doubleday, 1952, 189 pp.Russian Roulette, New York, Harcourt, 1955When Strangers Meet, New York, Doubleday, 1956Kill With Kindness, New York, Doubleday, 1962

as Michael GillianWarrant for a Wanton, New York, Mill-William Morrow & Company, 1952, 246 pp.

with Mary Edgley (as Brook Hastings)The Demon Within, New York, Doubleday, 1953

Notes

References

Further reading
 "Son and Father Held in East Chicago Death". The Times (Munster, Indiana). April 21, 1930. p. 3. 
 Edgley, Leslie (April 12, 1932). "An Honest Man". Shamokin News-Dispatch. p. 3
 Edgley, Leslie (April 20, 1933). "Valor's a Name". Shamokin News-Dispatch. p. 6
 Edgley, Leslie (January 9, 1944). "Solid Citizen". New York Daily News. p. C24 
 "TV Films in Production as of Friday, Aug. 29: Federal Telefilm, Inc.". Variety. September 3, 1952. p. 18
 
 United Press (September 30, 1952). "Ex-Red Bares More Film Names". New York Daily News. p. 34
 
 
 Hughes, Dorothy B. (January 30, 1953). "Report Card of Crime". The Albuquerque Tribune. p. 14
 Fink, John (December 30, 1956). "In TV Dramas, The Certainty Is Uncertainty". Chicago Tribune. Pt. 3, p. 6
 
 
 
 
 
 
 Hughes, Dorothy B. (March 2, 1969). "The Crime File: Suspense Novels Await Scrutiny". Los Angeles Times''. Calendar, p. 38.

External links

20th-century American novelists
1912 births
2002 deaths
People from East Chicago, Indiana
British emigrants to Canada
Canadian emigrants to the United States